Ultan Dillane (born 9 November 1993) is an Irish rugby union player. He plays for La Rochelle in the Top 14 which is the top tier of rugby union in France. Dillane primarily plays as a lock.

Early life
Dillane was born in Paris, France to an Irish mother. His father is from the Ivory Coast. At the age of seven, Dillane moved to Ireland, settling in Tralee in his mother's native county of Kerry. Dillane attended St Mary's Christian Brothers School in Tralee.

Youth and early career
Dillane first played rugby for his local club Tralee RFC. Invited to play by a neighbour, but reluctant to take up the sport at first, Dillane and his brother were promised €5 by their mother if they went. While with Tralee, Dillane was involved in the youth set up of his local provincial team, Munster. Dillane left the Munster set up however, and joined the academy of Connacht.

Club rugby
Dillane came into the Connacht academy for the 2012–13 season. In the 2014–15 season, while still a third year academy player, Dillane made his Connacht debut. He came on as a replacement in a provincial derby against Connacht's Irish rivals Leinster on 19 December 2014, and followed this up with his first start, which came against Ulster, another Irish province, on 26 December. On 1 January, Dillane was a replacement in another Irish derby, playing against his native province of Munster. Following his performances in these games, Dillane was awarded a senior contract with Connacht, to run until the summer of 2017.

In December 2021, it was announced that Dillane would leave Connacht at the end of the season. The following year he agreed a two-year contract with La Rochelle, to start with the prominent French club in the 2022–23 season.

International career
Dillane received his first senior Ireland call up from coach Joe Schmidt as part of the squad for the 2016 Six Nations. He made his international debut as a replacement in the third round match against England on 27 February 2016.

References

External links
Pro12 Profile
ESPN Scrum Profile

1993 births
Living people
Alumni of the University of Galway
Connacht Rugby players
French people of Irish descent
French sportspeople of Ivorian descent
French rugby union players
Ireland international rugby union players
Irish rugby union players
Irish people of Ivorian descent
Irish sportspeople of African descent
Irish people of French descent
Rugby union players from County Kerry
Rugby union players from Paris
Black Irish people
Rugby union locks